Natella Arkhipovna Krasnikova (Russian: Нателла Архиповна Красникова; born 14 October 1953, in Mogocha, Zabaykalsky Krai, Russian SFSR) is a Russian field hockey player and Olympic medalist. She was born in Mogocha. Competing for the Soviet Union, she won a bronze medal at the 1980 Summer Olympics in Moscow.

Krasnikova scored 220 goals for Soviet Union which was a world record for 20 years. She scored 22 goals in just 5 matches in Intercontinental Cup in Buenos Aires in 1985, including a hat-trick in the 3-2 win against Argentina in the final.

References

External links

1953 births
Living people
People from Zabaykalsky Krai
Russian female field hockey players
Olympic field hockey players of the Soviet Union
Soviet female field hockey players
Field hockey players at the 1980 Summer Olympics
Olympic bronze medalists for the Soviet Union
Olympic medalists in field hockey
Medalists at the 1980 Summer Olympics
Sportspeople from Zabaykalsky Krai